This article details the 2010–11 UEFA Europa League play-off round.

Each tie was played over two legs, with each team playing one leg at home. The team that had the higher aggregate score over the two legs progressed to the next round. In the event that aggregate scores finished level, the away goals rule was applied; i.e. the team that scored more goals away from home over the two legs progressed. If away goals were also equal, then 30 minutes of extra time was played, divided into two 15-minute halves. The away goals rule was again applied after extra time; i.e. if there were goals scored during extra time and the aggregate score was still level, the visiting team qualified by virtue of more away goals scored. If no goals were scored during extra time, the tie was decided by a penalty shootout.

All times are CEST (UTC+2)

Round and draw dates
All draws were held at UEFA headquarters in Nyon, Switzerland.

Matches may also be played on Tuesdays or Wednesdays instead of the regular Thursdays due to scheduling conflicts.

Play-off round

Seeding

Matches

|}
Notes
Note 1: Order of legs reversed after original draw.

First leg

Notes
Note 2: Played in Bratislava at Štadión Pasienky as Slovan Bratislava's Tehelné pole is undergoing extensive renovative work.
Note 3: Played in Nyíregyháza at Városi Stadion as Debrecen's Stadion Oláh Gábor Út did not meet UEFA criteria.
Note 4: Played in Sofia at Vasil Levski National Stadium as CSKA Sofia's Balgarska Armiya Stadium was closed at the end of the previous season because it didn't meet the BFU and UEFA criteria.

Second leg

CSKA Moscow won 6–1 on aggregate.

Club Brugge won 5–3 on aggregate.

Borussia Dortmund won 5–0 on aggregate.

AZ won 3–2 on aggregate.

BATE won 5–1 on aggregate.

2–2 on aggregate. Lausanne-Sport won 4–3 on penalties.

Villarreal won 7–1 on aggregate.

Beşiktaş won 6–0 on aggregate.

Aris won 2–1 on aggregate.

Metalist Kharkiv won 3–2 on aggregate.

Sporting CP won 3–2 on aggregate.

Getafe won 2–1 on aggregate.

Hajduk Split won 5–2 on aggregate.

Debrecen won 4–1 on aggregate.

1–1 on aggregate. Steaua București won 4–3 on penalties.

Liverpool won 3–1 on aggregate.

Levski Sofia won 2–1 on aggregate.

PSV Eindhoven won 5–1 on aggregate.

Paris Saint-Germain won 5–4 on aggregate.

Bayer Leverkusen won 6–1 on aggregate.

Gent won 2–1 on aggregate.

AEK Athens won 2–1 on aggregate.

Stuttgart won 3–2 on aggregate.

Lech Poznań won 1–0 on aggregate.

Utrecht won 4–2 on aggregate.

CSKA Sofia won 5–2 on aggregate.

3–3 on aggregate. Karpaty Lviv won on away goals.

Palermo won 5–3 on aggregate.

Lille won 2–0 on aggregate.

Napoli won 3–0 on aggregate.

Juventus won 3–1 on aggregate.

Rapid Wien won 4–3 on aggregate.

Odense won 3–1 on aggregate.

PAOK won 2–1 on aggregate.

Manchester City won 3–0 on aggregate.

Dinamo Zagreb won 4–1 on aggregate.

Porto won 7–2 on aggregate.

Notes
Note 5: Played in Baku at Tofiq Bahramov Stadium as Qarabağ's Guzanli Olympic Stadium did not meet UEFA criteria.
Note 6: Played in Bucharest at Stadionul Steaua as Unirea Urziceni's Stadionul Tineretului did not meet UEFA criteria.
Note 7: Played in Piraeus at Karaiskakis Stadium as AEK Athens's Olympic Stadium was deemed unsuitable due to the quality of the playing surface. Initially, it would be played in Athens at Nea Smyrni Stadium but it was vandalised by Panionios ultras who have a fierce violent rivalry with AEK Athens's ultras. As a result of this, UEFA decreed that no AEK fans would be allowed to watch the match inside the stadium.
Note 8: Played in Wrexham at Racecourse Ground as The New Saints chose to move the match from their Park Hall ground to increase revenue.

References

External links
2010–11 UEFA Europa League, UEFA.com

Play-Off Round
UEFA Europa League qualifying rounds